Myer (or Meyer) Prinstein (born Mejer Prinsztejn, December 22, 1878 – March 10, 1925) was a Polish American track and field athlete and member of the Irish American Athletic Club.  He held the world record for the long jump and won gold medals in three Olympic Games for the long jump and triple jump.

Early life
Prinstein was Jewish and was born in Szczuczyn, in Russian-ruled Poland.  His parents, Jacob and Julia Prinstein (born Jankiel Prinsztejn and Judes Rubinsztejn), emigrated to New York City in 1883 and soon thereafter moved to Syracuse, New York, where Myer was raised. They had five daughters and four sons; Jacob was a grocer and baker. Myer was the third child.

Prinstein was captain of the Syracuse University track team, and graduated with a law degree in 1901.

World record
Prinstein set a long jump world record of 7.235 m (23' 8⅞") in  New York on June 11, 1898. However, the record was soon broken, first by William Newburn of Ireland on June 18, 1898, and then by Alvin Kraenzlein on May 26, 1899. On April 28, 1900, Prinstein set a new record of 7.50 m (24' 7¼") in Philadelphia.  Four months later, on August 29, 1900, this record was also broken by Peter O'Connor of Ireland.

Olympic Games
Prinstein won the silver medal in the long jump at the 1900 Summer Olympics in Paris, France, losing to Alvin Kraenzlein after being denied permission by Syracuse officials to compete in the final because it was contested on a Sunday – despite the fact that Prinstein was a Jew, and Kraenzlein, who was a Christian, did compete. The two had had an informal agreement not to compete on Sunday, and when Prinstein learned that Kraenzlein had competed he became angry and, depending on the account, punched Kraenzlein in the face or was restrained from doing so.  The following day, he won the gold medal in the hop, step and jump (triple jump), beating 1896 champion James Connolly with a leap of 14.47 meters which simultaneously set the Olympic Record.

Competing as a member of the Irish American Athletic Club in St. Louis 1904 he won both the long jump (setting an Olympic record) and the hop, step and jump on the same day, the only athlete ever to win both events in the same games. He also came 5th in both the 60 m and 400 m dash.

In Athens 1906 he again won the long jump competition, beating the world record holder, Peter O'Connor. The only judge for the competition was Matthew Halpin, who was manager of the American team. O'Connor protested, but was overruled. He continued to protest Halpin's decisions through the remainder of the competition.  The distances were not announced until the end of the competition.  When they were, Prinstein had won with his very first jump.

Later career
Prinstein did not compete in the Olympics after 1906. He practiced law in Jamaica, Queens, and later became a businessman. He died in 1925 at age 46 of a heart ailment at Mount Sinai Hospital, New York.

Myer Prinstein was inducted into the International Jewish Sports Hall of Fame in 1982.

See also
List of Jewish American athletes
List of select Jewish track and field athletes

Notes

References

External links

Jewish community of Szczuczyn
Winged Fist Organization

1878 births
1925 deaths
People from Grajewo County
People from Łomża Governorate
Sportspeople from Podlaskie Voivodeship
Congress Poland emigrants to the United States
American people of Polish-Jewish descent
Track and field athletes from New York (state)
Sportspeople from Syracuse, New York
American male triple jumpers
American male long jumpers
Olympic gold medalists for the United States in track and field
Olympic silver medalists for the United States in track and field
Athletes (track and field) at the 1900 Summer Olympics
Athletes (track and field) at the 1904 Summer Olympics
Athletes (track and field) at the 1906 Intercalated Games
World record setters in athletics (track and field)
Jewish American sportspeople
Jewish male athletes (track and field)
Medalists at the 1904 Summer Olympics
Medalists at the 1900 Summer Olympics
Medalists at the 1906 Intercalated Games